Lance Jenkins Dixon (born 22 June 1961, in Pasadena, California) is an American theoretical particle physicist. He is a professor in the SLAC Theory Group at the Stanford Linear Accelerator Center (SLAC) at Stanford University.

Dixon received in 1982 his B.S. in physics and applied mathematics from Caltech and received in 1986 his doctorate from Princeton University. As a postdoc he was at SLAC. From 1987 he was assistant professor at Princeton University, from 1989 he was a Panofsky Fellow at the SLAC and in 1992 he became an associate professor and in 1998 a full professor at SLAC.

He has been a visiting professor at the École normale supérieure and the University of Cambridge (Clare Hall).

Starting in the 1990s Dixon developed, with Zvi Bern and others, new methods (generalized unitarity methods among others) for the calculation of Feynman diagrams in quantum chromodynamics (QCD) and other Yang–Mills theories. These new methods became more relevant with the requirements of the Large Hadron Collider calculations in the 2000s and also provided new insights into the divergences in the supergravity perturbation series.

In 2014, with Zvi Bern and David Kosower, Dixon received the Sakurai Prize for "pathbreaking contributions to the calculation of perturbative scattering amplitudes, which led to a deeper understanding of quantum field theory and to powerful new tools for computing QCD processes."

His 1991 publication with Vadim S. Kaplunovsky and Jan Louis has over 800 citations. In 1995 Dixon was elected a Fellow of the American Physical Society.

He was elected a member of the National Academy of Sciences in 2022.

Selected publications
 Dixon "Calculating scattering amplitudes efficiently", TASI Lectures 1996
 Dixon "UV Behavior of N = 8 Supergravity", Erice School 2009
 Bern, Dixon, Kosower "Quantum Gravity Particles may resemble ordinary particles of force2", Scientific American, May 2012
 Bern, Dixon, Kosower "On-shell methods in perturbative QCD", Annals of Physics, 322, 2007, 1587–1634
 Bern, Dixon, Kosower "Progress in 1 loop QCD calculations", Annual Review Nuclear Particle Physics, 46, 1996, 109–148

Awards, honors 

 Fellow, American Physical Society, 1995
 Fellow, National Academy of Sciences, 2022
 Galileo Galilei Medal, 2023

References

External links
 Homepage at SLAC
 
 
 
 

California Institute of Technology alumni
Princeton University alumni
Stanford University faculty
Fellows of the American Physical Society
Particle physicists
21st-century American physicists
J. J. Sakurai Prize for Theoretical Particle Physics recipients
1961 births
Living people
Members of the United States National Academy of Sciences